The siege of Narva was a Russian siege of the Livonian city of Narva (in modern-day eastern Estonia) from April through May 1558, during the Livonian War. After capturing the city in July 1558, the Russians used Narva as a trading center and port to transport commerce from Pskov and Novgorod. The Russians controlled the city until 1581, when it was captured by Swedish forces under Pontus De La Gardie.

References 

Conflicts in 1558
Battles of the Livonian War
Narva (1558)
1558 in Europe
16th century in Estonia
Battles in Estonia
Battles involving the Livonian Order